Thelocarpon is a genus of fungi in the family Thelocarpaceae.

Species

Thelocarpon albidum 
Thelocarpon algicola 
Thelocarpon andicola 
Thelocarpon citrum 
Thelocarpon coccosporum 
Thelocarpon cyaneum 
Thelocarpon epibolum 
Thelocarpon immersum 
Thelocarpon imperceptum 
Thelocarpon impressellum 
Thelocarpon intermediellum 
Thelocarpon laureri 
Thelocarpon lichenicola 
Thelocarpon macchiae 
Thelocarpon magnussonii 
Thelocarpon microsporum 
Thelocarpon nigrum 
Thelocarpon olivaceum 
Thelocarpon opertum 
Thelocarpon pallidum 
Thelocarpon palniense 
Thelocarpon robustum 
Thelocarpon sandwicense 
Thelocarpon saxicola 
Thelocarpon sphaerosporum 
Thelocarpon strasseri 
Thelocarpon subantarcticum 
Thelocarpon superellum 
Thelocarpon triseptatum

References

Ascomycota enigmatic taxa
Ascomycota genera
Lichen genera
Taxa named by William Nylander (botanist)
Taxa described in 1852